Lake Ina is about  east of Lake Roy. Lake Ina is inside the city of Winter Haven, Florida, and is bordered by Cypress Garden Boulevard on its north. In fact, a bridge carries this street over the extreme northern edge of the lake.  Lake Ina has a  surface area. The lake is irregularly shaped and is bordered from its northeast side to its southwest side by residences.  Vacant grassland borders the rest of the west side.

Lake Ina has no public swimming area or boat ramp.  There is public access along the west and northwest shore area.  The Fishing Works website has one user who submitted a rating; that user rated the fishing there as fair.  The Hook and Bullet website says Lake Ina contains sturgeon, crappie and bowfin.

References

Ina